Meixnerididae is a family of Maricola triclads.

References

Maricola